Pystira is a genus of spiders in the jumping spider family Salticidae.

Taxonomy
The genus Pystira was erected by Eugène Simon in 1901 with the type species Pystira ephippigera, which he had originally placed in a different genus (Hadrosoma, no longer in use) when he first described it in 1885. In 2015, Junxia Zhang and Wayne Maddison synonymized Pystira with Omoedus, but this was rejected by Jerzy Prószyński in 2017, and the genus is accepted by the World Spider Catalog .

When synonymized with Omoedus, the genus was placed in the tribe Euophryini in Maddison's 2015 classification of the family Salticidae. Prószyński placed the separated genus in his informal group euophryines.

Species
, the World Spider Catalog accepted the following extant species:
Pystira cyanothorax (Thorell, 1881) – New Guinea
Pystira ephippigera (Simon, 1885) (type species) – Sumatra
Pystira karschi (Thorell, 1881) – New Guinea, Aru Islands
Pystira nigripalpis (Thorell, 1877) – Sulawesi
Pystira versicolor Dyal, 1935 – Pakistan

References

Salticidae
Salticidae genera